Rising Falcon Cinema is Gregory Cahill's production company.  It also was one of the production companies involved with Two Shadows and The Golden Voice.  Cahill is working on a new project,  Metalheads, through Rising Falcon Cinema as well.

References

Entertainment companies of the United States
Mass media companies of the United States